Killay may refer to:

 Killay, County Tyrone, a townland and hamlet near Pomeroy in County Tyrone, Northern Ireland
 Killay, Swansea, a suburb and local government community in Swansea, Wales